Berkley may refer to:

People 
 Berkley (surname)
 Berkley Bedell (1921–2019), American politician

Places

United Kingdom
 Berkley, Somerset

United States
 Berkley, Colorado
 Berkley, Iowa
 Berkley, Maryland
 Berkley, Massachusetts
 Berkley, Michigan
 Berkley, Virginia, formerly a town, and now a neighborhood in Norfolk, Virginia
 Berkley (Washington, D.C.), a neighborhood also known as Foxhall Crescent

Other uses 
 Berkley Books, an imprint of Penguin Group (USA) (also known as Berkley Publishing Co.)
 Berkley Center for Religion, Peace, and World Affairs at Georgetown University, Washington, D.C., United States
 Berkley (fishing), a fishing tackle company, Spirit Lake, Iowa, United States

See also 
 Berkley Bridge (disambiguation)
 Berkeley (disambiguation)
 Berklee College of Music in Boston, Massachusetts, United States